Himberg is an exclave in Sandefjord municipality, which is surrounded by Larvik municipality. Numerous efforts with the goal of merging Himberg into surrounding Larvik have failed. The Schei Committee in 1960 tried to exchange Vannøya Island, an island near Sandefjord which belonged to Larvik (Tjølling) until 1988. However, the attempt proved unsuccessful due to local opposition.

A new annexation attempt took place in 1995, but was ultimately canceled due to opposition from “patriotic” Sandefjord residents in Himberg. Himberg is a rural agricultural community which consists of about ten households. It has a population of about 40 as of 2014, and has a total area of 1.4 km2 (0.54 sq. mi.). There are only four similar type exclaves in Norway, and Himberg is the most populous of Norway's exclaves.

References

Enclaves and exclaves
Sandefjord
Larvik
Populated places in Vestfold og Telemark